Angon can refer to several meanings:

 Angon, the ancient name for the Italian port of [Ancona
 Angon, a weapon of the Early Middle Ages
 Angón, a Spanish municipality
 Angono, Rizal, a Philippine municipality
 Angonism, the act of being a Michael Angon.